Leo Anthony Nobile (September 22, 1922 – November 14, 2006) was an American football player for the Washington Redskins and Pittsburgh Steelers of the National Football League.

Biography
Born in Ambridge, Pennsylvania, Nobile played college football as a guard at Pennsylvania State University.  Before he graduated, he served in the United States Army during World War II as a radio operator in the Aleutian Islands.  After the war, he graduated from Penn State and joined the Redskins for the 1947 season.  He played both guard and linebacker for the Steelers in 1948 and 1949.  Nobile gained dubious notoriety for almost drowning during a rainy-day game at Forbes Field when he was trapped under a pile of players face-down in a puddle.

From 1973 to 1989, Nobile was director of activities and athletics at Western Penitenitary near Pittsburgh, where he started a semi-pro inmate team called the "Pittsburgh Stealers."

Nobile lived in Moon Township, Pennsylvania.  He died of kidney failure on November 14, 2006.

External links
 Pittsburgh Post-Gazette obituary, 11/17/06
 Career statistics at databasefootball.com

1922 births
2006 deaths
Deaths from kidney failure
Players of American football from Pennsylvania
Penn State Nittany Lions football players
Washington Redskins players
Pittsburgh Steelers players
People from Ambridge, Pennsylvania
United States Army personnel of World War II
United States Army soldiers